Christopher Badenhorst  (born 12 December 1965) is a South African former rugby union player.

Playing career

In 1994 he toured with the Springboks to New Zealand and Britain and Ireland. In addition to the 2 Test matches, he also played ten tour matches and scored 7 tries for the Springboks.

Test history

See also
List of South Africa national rugby union players – Springbok no. 610
List of South Africa national rugby sevens players

References

1965 births
Living people
Cheetahs (rugby union) players
Rugby union players from Windhoek
South Africa international rugby sevens players
South Africa international rugby union players
South African rugby union players
Rugby union wings